Design U is a Canadian television series which premiered on April 4, 2005 on HGTV (Canada). Produced by Mountain Road Productions the series takes the design-clueless back to school for a crash course in interior design. After one intense day with a professional designer—learning the ins and outs of design theory—the design student gets to test their newly acquired design savvy during a two-day makeover. With $3000 and a team of renovators at their disposal, the student has to transform one room in their house. At the end, the design professor returns to review the results to see if the student makes the grade.

Faculty

Maureen Ross Neilson

Host Seasons 1-4

Originally from Ottawa, ON, Maureen Ross Neilson graduated from Canterbury School of the Arts. She then continued her studies in Toronto, studying the performing arts at Ryerson University.

Maureen comes from a strong background in improvisational comedy.  She was very involved with The Canadian Improv Games, both as a participant, and then later as a workshop programmer and adjudicator. In Toronto she has toured with several different comedy troupes, thoroughly enjoying the fan base that laughed their way with her through the 1990s.

Maureen has had an eclectic career to date, from playing several of the Bard's ladies as a clown, to puppeteering on the popular CBC children's television series, Mr. Dressup. Most recently, Maureen has appeared in numerous memorable roles. She starred as Laraine Newman alongside Jamie Gertz in It's Always Something: The Gilda Radner Story on ABC. She also played a young Sophia Loren in the movie Between Strangers and appears has Dr. Sharon DeLauro on the hit series DOC.

Ernst Hupel

Designer Seasons 1-4

Ernst is the co-owner of 2H Interior Design Ltd. and has been an interior designer for over 15 years. With a focus on custom, high-end residential and commercial spaces, he has a reputation for high quality, original and innovative design. Ernst has worked with a diverse group of clients, both in Canada and internationally, and is widely respected for his classic approach to design and for maintaining the integrity of the spaces he works on.

Melanie Martin

Designer Seasons 1-4

Melanie studied in both the Interior Design and Residential Décor programs at Algonquin College in Ottawa, ON and graduated with honours. She has been working in the interior design business since 1991 and founded her own company, Distinctive Designs, in 1995. She specializes in residential interior design, interior decorating and, with her team of design and architectural associates, works on custom new home design as well as custom renovations.

Melanie has won awards for her design work as well as for business achievement. She has given numerous public seminars for the Canadian Mortgage and Housing Corporation, TD Canada Trust, Chapters, and has been a featured expert at various design home shows. Melanie has written design and décor related articles for newspapers and magazines and has also shared her knowledge by teaching for the Ottawa Board of Education and Algonquin College. She has also been an active member with the Ottawa Carleton Home Builders’ Association since 1997 and has acted as Chairperson of the Home Show Committee for 1999 and 2000.

Baron Bryant

Project Consultant & Lead Carpenter Season 4

Growing up in the artistically inclined community of Chelsea, Quebec, Baron Bryant was exposed to countless artists and artisans. It was this creative environment that inspired him to pursue a successful career in carpentry and design.

For over fifteen years Baron specialized in stick frame, timber and log home construction before moving into prop construction in 2002. For three years he worked at the National Arts Centre in Ottawa with some of the country's most renowned set designers and builders. Working with various materials he was able to bring many theatrical designs to life. He then brought his skills to film as a set builder, set dresser, prop master and special effects technician for H2O starring Paul Gross and a number of TV movies of the week. Not long after, Baron made the leap to on-camera work in 2007 when he appeared in the second season of the television series From the Ground Up with Debbie Travis. More recently Baron's projects include building sets for Odyssey Theater's staging of A Curious Mishap, Charbonneau Productions’ television series Moitie Moitie, and Instinct Films’ Six Days in June. When he's not busy building, creating, and designing Baron can be found canoeing, road-biking, or cross-country skiing.

Christina Maureen Rice

Seamstress & Project Assistant Season 2, 3 & 4

Christina is a certified interior decorator who studied in the Residential Décor program at Algonquin College in Ottawa and graduated with honours in 1999. She has established her own interior decorating company, TaDa! Interior Design, and enjoys decorating her clients' homes according to their own personalities and styles. Christina is able to assist with all a home's needs from simple paint consultations to larger, more involved, renovation projects. As well as being a successful decorator, Christina is also an experienced seamstress and has become well known for her custom designs. She specializes in window treatments, bedding, and soft furnishings.

William Mood

Assistant Carpenter & Project Manager Season 2, 3 & 4

Will was born and raised on a farm just outside Peterborough, ON where he developed a strong work ethic, self-deprecating sense of humour, and a quick wit. He also learned to never shy away from a challenge. A Carleton University honours graduate in film studies, Will has been on a constant quest for a career to sustain his endless thirst for knowledge. After stints as a miner, an architect's assistant, a pipe fitter, and a production assistant for an animation company, Will answered a call for a carpenter's assistant for Mountain Road Productions’ Gemini-award winning series Broken House Chronicles. This led to three seasons of behind-the-scenes assistant carpentry on MRP’s hit series Me, My House & I along with production work on other television shows, specials, and films shot in the Ottawa area.

During the first season of Design U Will served as the show’s Project Manager, where he assisted the carpentry team off-camera and supervised all the design projects seen on the show. Now, Will is in front of the camera helping make our design students’ ideas a reality. When not working in television, Will manages an independent video store in downtown Ottawa and plays on two or three baseball teams. Rumour has it he has seen every movie ever made.

Blair Varden

Assistant Carpenter Season 4

Blair is a good old prairie boy born in Dauphin, MB. His family moved around for many short stints in countless Manitoba towns before being transferred to Ottawa, ON. As a teenager, Blair was bitten by the theatre bug early on in high school, performing in various productions and drama festivals. This led to his discovery of improvisational theatre and his participation in the Canadian Improv Games at the National Arts Centre as a member of the Cairine Wilson Improv team for four years.

Before leaving Ottawa to study theatre at Bishop's University, Blair developed his skills with power tools during summer employment building parks and playgrounds for the city. These carpentry skills were easily transferred to technical theatre. Set building after rehearsal became a favourite activity of his at Bishop's. During Season 3 of Design U, Blair served as the off-camera assistant carpenter helping the crew in any way possible - usually making sure no dessert went to waste. After perfecting the art of not cracking the camera lens while in front of it, Blair made the leap to on-camera assistant carpenter for Season 4.

Penny Southam

Designer Seasons 1 & 2

Award-winning, Registered Interior Designer, Penny Southam, ARIDO, IDC, established Southam Design Inc. in 1992. The firm has become one of Ottawa's top residential design firms - combining modern lines with classic elements to create unique interior and architectural spaces. Penny's firm creates everything from the smallest interior detail to award-winning custom homes. Her client list extends from Montreal to Vancouver, BC.

Penny has also given many design seminars at local design shows, written a weekly design column for The Ottawa Citizen newspaper, and written numerous articles for magazines such as Ottawa Interiors and Style at Home.

More recently, Penny is one of the hosts of W Network's hit series All for Nothing? alongside Paul Rushforth, giving homeowners design tips on how to increase the market value of their homes while spending as little money as possible.

Ramón Robleto

Designer Season 1

Ramon studied both industrial and residential design and has been an interior designer for over seven years. Currently, he works for the Government of Canada as a design manager in the architectural and interior design unit. His main focus is on space planning and design development and he is very interested expanding his career to include architecture.

Tyler Hamilton

Project Consultant & Lead Carpenter Seasons 1–3

Tyler Hamilton is a self-employed carpenter working primarily in the residential market. He is a born carpenter and clients will attest to the high quality of his craftsmanship and his enthusiasm for his work. Tyler is also an accomplished singer and performer. No stranger to audiences, he first performed in his hometown church in Edmonton at the age of five. He later joined the Scola Cantorum Boys Choir and went on to perform at annual community events including fairs, talent festivals, and citywide musical productions. Tyler has sung the national anthem at Edmonton's Commonwealth Stadium for the Canadian Football League and was a featured soloist with the Edmonton Symphony Orchestra.

More recently, he achieved national notoriety as one of the top finalists on the inaugural edition of the popular television series Canadian Idol. In the summer of 2004, Tyler starred as Curly in the musical Oklahoma, presented by The Sunshine Festival Theatre Company in Orillia, ON. He continues to write and record music whenever he can.

Jeff Palmer

Assistant Carpenter Season 1

Jeff Palmer grew up surrounded by the construction and design business. With a father who is a general contractor, a mother who is an architect and a degree in Urban Studies from the University of British Columbia, it only made sense that he join the family business. For the past two years he has worked with his parents in their family-owned company, Prospect Builders Ltd., located just outside Ottawa. Prior to returning to Ottawa, Jeff established a small but successful construction company in Vancouver. Jeff enjoys cutting-edge design, making furniture, and painting – basically anything that allows him to work with his hands and be creative.

Lucie Soulard

Assistant Carpenter Season 1

Lucie Soulard is a self-employed Jill-of-all-trades: carpenter, sewer, upholsterer, painter, mother of two boys. A native of Ottawa, Lucie began her professional life in the hospitality industry. After several years, she decided to change careers and enrolled in Ottawa's Algonquin College. There, she received a degree in Interior Design and there was no turning back. Before starting her own company, SOULARDesign, Lucie worked in industrial and commercial design. Currently, her projects focus on residential design and renovation. Lucie loves her workshop, her woodworking tools, and her well-worn steel toe boots.

Episodes

Season 1 (2005)

Season 2 (2006)

Season 3 (2007)

Season 4 (2008)

Awards

|-
| 2009
| Design U
| Gemini Award, Category: Best Original Music for a Lifestyle/Practical Information or Reality Program or Series – David Burns "Bruno’s Daughter’s Bedroom"
| 
|-
| 2009
| Design U
| New York Festivals, Category: Educational/Instructional TV - "Sandra's Bedroom/James' Basement/Bruno's Daughter's Bedroom"
|  Gold World Medal
|-
| 2008
| Design U
| Summit Emerging Media Awards (EMA), Category: Media Website
|  Leader Award
|-
| 2007
| Design U
| Summit Awards (SIA), Category: Movie/Film Music Website
|  Bronze
|-
| 2007
| Design U
| Yorkton Film Festival, Golden Sheaf Award, Category: Lifestyle Programs
|  
|-
|}

International Syndication

External links 
 
 http://www.mountainroad.ca/mrp/portfolio/design_u.php
 https://web.archive.org/web/20110823043801/http://expressmedia.ca/store/index.php?cPath=21_42
 Residential Design

2005 Canadian television series debuts
2008 Canadian television series endings
HGTV (Canada) original programming
2000s Canadian reality television series